Barugh Green (locally pronounced as Bark Green or  occasionally mis-pronounced as Bart Green) is a semi-rural commuter village in the metropolitan borough of Barnsley in South Yorkshire, England. The village falls within the Barnsley Metropolitan Council Ward of Darton West.

Like many other villages, Barugh Green has lost some of its heritage and cultural identity in the past 30 years. The once central Phoenix Inn public house closed in 1999 and the Spencers Arms closed in 2010 (now Little India, a takeaway which has a unique cooking school), leaving only Barugh Green Working Men's Club and the newly renovated Crown and Anchor.

References

External links

 Barugh Green Primary School
 Crown & Anchor Public House

Villages in South Yorkshire
Geography of Barnsley